Athukoralalage Pelawatthe Kapila Nuwan Athukorala is a Sri Lankan politician and Member of Parliament.

Athukorala contested the 2015 parliamentary election as one of the United People's Freedom Alliance (UPFA) electoral alliance's candidates in Trincomalee District but failed to get elected after coming 3rd amongst the UPFA candidates. He contested the 2020 parliamentary election as a Sri Lanka People's Freedom Alliance electoral alliance candidate in Trincomalee District and was elected to the Parliament of Sri Lanka.

References

Living people
Members of the 16th Parliament of Sri Lanka
Sinhalese politicians
Sri Lankan Buddhists
Sri Lanka People's Freedom Alliance politicians
Sri Lanka Podujana Peramuna politicians
United People's Freedom Alliance politicians
Year of birth missing (living people)